The Namibia women's national cricket team, nicknamed the Capricorn Eagles, represents the country of Namibia in international women's cricket. The team is organised by Cricket Namibia, which has been a member of the International Cricket Council (ICC) since 1992.

History
Namibia made its international debut at the 2004 Africa Women's Cricket Tournament in Tanzania, but failed to win a match. The team's closest result came in the opening match against Kenya, where they were bowled out for 106, and eventually lost by five wickets. In the second game, against Uganda, they lost by 152 runs, while in the final game, against Tanzania, they were bowled out for just 29, and lost by ten wickets. After their debut, Namibia did not compete in another Africa-wide tournament until the 2011 ICC Africa Women's T20 Tournament in Uganda. They have since regularly competed in ICC Africa competitions, without much success. Namibia also play in regional competitions against other southern African teams, and in the past have appeared in South African provincial competitions (as the national men's team does).

In April 2018, the International Cricket Council (ICC) granted full Women's Twenty20 International (WT20I) status to all its members. Therefore, all Twenty20 matches played between Namibia women and another international side since 1 July 2018 have been full WT20Is.

Namibia's first WT20I matches were contested as part of the Botswana 7s tournament in August 2018 against Botswana, Lesotho, Malawi, Mozambique, Sierra Leone and Zambia (Zambia's matches were not classified as WT20Is as they had a Botswanan player in their squad). Namibia finished top of the table, winning all five group stage matches and won the final against Sierra Leone by a margin of nine wickets.

In July 2019, the International Cricket Council (ICC) suspended Zimbabwe Cricket, with the team barred from taking part in ICC events. The following month, with Zimbabwe banned from taking part in international cricket tournaments, the ICC confirmed that Namibia would replace them in the 2019 ICC Women's World Twenty20 Qualifier tournament.

In December 2020, the ICC announced the qualification pathway for the 2023 ICC Women's T20 World Cup. Namibia were named in the 2021 ICC Women's T20 World Cup Africa Qualifier regional group, alongside ten other teams.

Tournament history

ICC Women's T20 World Cup Qualifier
 2019: 8th (DNQ)

ICC Women's T20 World Cup Africa Qualifier
 2019: 2nd (Q) (Namibia replaced qualifier winner Zimbabwe in the main qualifier tournament due to suspension of Zimbabwe)
 2021: 2nd (DNQ)

Kwibuka Women's T20 Tournament
 2021: 2nd

Records and Statistics 

International Match Summary — Namibia Women
 
Last updated 3 July 2022

Twenty20 International 

 Highest team total: 221/3 v Germany, 3 July 2022 at Bayer Uerdingen Cricket Ground, Krefeld.
 Highest individual score: 93*, Sune Wittmann v Botswana, 8 June 2021 at Gahanga International Cricket Stadium, Kigali.
 Best individual bowling figures: 5/6, Wilka Mwatile v Cameroon, 14 September 2021 at Botswana Cricket Association Oval 2, Gaborone.

Most WT20I runs for Namibia Women

Most WT20I wickets for Namibia Women

T20I record versus other nations

Records complete to T20I #1160. Last updated 3 July 2022.

Current squad
The following players were picked for the 2021 Kwibuka Women's T20 Tournament. :

See also
 List of Namibia women Twenty20 International cricketers

References

Women's
Women's national cricket teams
Cricket